Oskars Aleksandrs Johans Bārs   (17 October 1848, in Dobele – 9 January 1914, in Riga) was a Latvian architect.
He is most noted for his work in Jelgava. From 1875 to 1879 he designed and constructed the Jelgavas Synagogue in the city.

References

1848 births
1914 deaths
Latvian architects
People from Dobele